The 2002 Subway 400 was the second stock car race of the 2002 NASCAR Winston Cup Series and the 37th iteration of the event. The race was held on Sunday, February 24, 2002, in Rockingham, North Carolina, at North Carolina Speedway, a  permanent high-banked racetrack. The race took the scheduled 393 laps to complete. At race's end, Matt Kenseth, driving for Roush Racing, would dominate the late stages of the race and win under caution when NASCAR determined oil and debris had made racing conditions unsafe with five to go. The win was Kenseth's second career NASCAR Winston Cup Series win and his first win of the season. To fill out the podium, Sterling Marlin of Chip Ganassi Racing and Bobby Labonte of Joe Gibbs Racing would finish second and third, respectively.

The win came under controversy after it was found that Kenseth's car was determined to be lower than minimum height requirements. Penalties were announced on Tuesday, February 26. Kenseth's crew chief, Robbie Reiser, was fined $30,000, but the win for Kenseth would stand. In a radio interview with, "Fast Talk with Benny Parsons", Kenseth stated that a dent in the roof, possibly from victory lane celebrations, had caused the car to fail minimum height requirements.

Background 

North Carolina Speedway was opened as a flat, one-mile oval on October 31, 1965. In 1969, the track was extensively reconfigured to a high-banked, D-shaped oval just over one mile in length. In 1997, North Carolina Motor Speedway merged with Penske Motorsports, and was renamed North Carolina Speedway. Shortly thereafter, the infield was reconfigured, and competition on the infield road course, mostly by the SCCA, was discontinued. Currently, the track is home to the Fast Track High Performance Driving School.

Entry list

Practice

First practice 
The first practice session was held on Friday, February 22, at 11:20 AM EST, and would last for two hours.

Second practice 
The second practice session was held on Saturday, February 23, at 9:30 AM EST, and would last for 45 minutes.

Third and final practice 
The third and final practice session, sometimes referred to as Happy Hour, was held on Saturday, February 23, at 11:15 AM EST, and would last for 45 minutes.

Qualifying 
Qualifying was held on Friday, February 22, at 3:05 PM EST. Each driver would have two laps to set a fastest time; the fastest of the two would count as their official qualifying lap. Positions 1-36 would be decided on time, while positions 37-43 would be based on provisionals. Six spots are awarded by the use of provisionals based on owner's points. The seventh is awarded to a past champion who has not otherwise qualified for the race. If no past champ needs the provisional, the next team in the owner points will be awarded a provisional.

Three drivers would fail to qualify: Dick Trickle, Randy Renfrow, and Carl Long.

Full qualifying results

Race results

References 

2002 NASCAR Winston Cup Series
NASCAR races at Rockingham Speedway
February 2002 sports events in the United States
2002 in sports in North Carolina